Mourad Hdiouad (born 10 September 1976) is a former Moroccan international footballer who played as a midfielder. He played 19 matches for the Moroccan national team, representing the country at the 2004 African Cup of Nations.

Honours

Club 

 Litex Lovech
 Bulgarian Cup: 2003–04

 CSKA Sofia
 Bulgarian Cup: 2005–06
 Bulgarian Super Cup: 2006

International 

 Morocco
 Africa Cup of Nations Second Place 2004

References

External links 
 

1976 births
Living people
Moroccan footballers
Moroccan expatriate footballers
Morocco international footballers
Botola players
AS FAR (football) players
PFC Litex Lovech players
PFC CSKA Sofia players
FC Augsburg players
Moroccan expatriate sportspeople in Bulgaria
Moroccan expatriate sportspeople in Germany
Expatriate footballers in Bulgaria
Expatriate footballers in Germany
First Professional Football League (Bulgaria) players
2. Bundesliga players
2004 African Cup of Nations players
Association football midfielders